"Ambition" is a song by American rapper Wale featuring American rappers Meek Mill and Rick Ross. It was released on October 28, 2011, as a track from Wale's second studio album Ambition (2011). The song was produced by T-Minus.

Background
In an interview with Complex in October 2011, Wale spoke about the song:

"Ambition" is a record that's on the album that's very important because it's the title track. The most famous rapper on the album is obviously Rick Ross, so I wanted him to bring a lot of attention to "Ambition" because it's what the album is about. I also wanted my fans to hear another side of Rick Ross. He touches on some things that he never really spoke on before on that verse."

Critical reception
The song was met with generally positive reviews from music critics. Rose Lilah of HotNewHipHop described it as "a solid addition to the commendable body of work Wale has been creating since stepping foot in the rap game". XXL called the song a "smooth, rolling opus".

Music video
The official music video was released on March 13, 2012. It sees the three rappers on a downtown Los Angeles rooftop and wearing leather jackets, while also showing flashbacks of Meek Mill and Rick Ross in the past.

Charts

Certifications

References

2011 songs
Wale (rapper) songs
Meek Mill songs
Rick Ross songs
Song recordings produced by T-Minus (record producer)
Songs written by Wale (rapper)
Songs written by Meek Mill
Songs written by Rick Ross
Songs written by T-Minus (record producer)